Starkowo  is a village in the administrative district of Gmina Przemęt, within Wolsztyn County, Greater Poland Voivodeship, in west-central Poland.

The village has an approximate population of 500.

References

Starkowo